Ariel Filloy (born March 11, 1987) is an Argentine-Italian professional basketball player for Derthona Basket of the Italian Lega Basket Serie A (LBA). He also plays for the Italian national basketball team.

Professional career
After a period in the second league of the Italian basketball league system, with Dinamo Sassari and Basket Rimini Crabs, he began his Italian LBA experience in 2008, when Armani Jeans Milano offered him a contract until 2012. Filloy played with Milano in the 2008-09 and 2011-12 seasons; between the two seasons he was sent on loan to Vanoli Soresina, and in Serie A2 with Bialetti Scafati and Pistoia Basket.

The player was released by Olimpia Milano in August 2012. He returned to Serie A2 with AcegasAps Trieste.

In summer 2013 he joined the LBA league side Pallacanestro Reggiana. In that season he won the FIBA EuroChallenge.

Filloy returned to Pistoia Basket and played with them two seasons until 2016.

At the end of the 2015-16 season, he signed with Umana Reyer Venezia.

On July 5, 2019, he has signed with Reyer Venezia of the Italian Lega Basket Serie A (LBA). 

In summer 2020, on August 10, Filloy joined VL Pesaro for the pre-season. But then, on August 20, he was signed for the rest of the season.

On July 9, 2021, Filloy signed with the newly promoted Derthona Basket.

References

External links
LBA profile 10 March 2017
Legadue profile 10 March 2017
http://www.basketballcl.com/16-17/Ariel-FILLOY Basketball Champions League profile] 10 March 2017

1987 births
Living people
2019 FIBA Basketball World Cup players
Argentine men's basketball players
Basket Rimini Crabs players
Dinamo Sassari players
Italian men's basketball players
Lega Basket Serie A players
Naturalised citizens of Italy
Olimpia Milano players
Pallacanestro Reggiana players
Pallacanestro Treviso players
Pallacanestro Trieste players
Pistoia Basket 2000 players
Point guards
Reyer Venezia players
S.S. Felice Scandone players
Scafati Basket players
Sportspeople from Córdoba, Argentina
Vanoli Cremona players
Victoria Libertas Pallacanestro players